is located in the Shikotsu-Toya National Park in Hokkaidō, Japan. It is located near both Tomakomai and Chitose towns and can be seen clearly from both. It is on the shores of Lake Shikotsu, a caldera lake. Tarumae is a 1,041 metre active andesitic stratovolcano, with a lava dome.

Eruptions
The most recent eruption, in 1982, was a phreatic eruption. Previous major eruptions have occurred in 1667, 1739 (plinian eruption of VEI 5), and 1909. The 1667 and 1739 eruptions were responsible for its present shape. Other eruptions were in 1919–21, 1923, 1926, 1933, 1936, 1944, 1951, 1953–55, and 1978.
Tarumae is an 'A' rank volcano — most likely to erupt in the relatively near future.

Hokkaido Natural Monument
Designated as a Hokkaido Natural Monument, it is popular as an easy climb for hikers who may start at the seventh station and then take an hour to reach the crater.

At the foot of Tarumae on the north-west side one can find an impressive moss-covered cavern (Koke-no-domon).

Gallery

See also
List of volcanoes in Japan
List of mountains in Japan
Tarumaezan Shrine

References

External links 

 Tarumaesan - Japan Meteorological Agency 
  - Japan Meteorological Agency
 Tarumae Volcano - Geological Survey of Japan
 

Calderas of Hokkaido
Active volcanoes
Stratovolcanoes of Japan
Lava domes
Volcanoes of Hokkaido
Mountains of Hokkaido
Shikotsu-Tōya National Park